Smyrnium is a genus of flowering plants in the family Apiaceae. Range in country of S. Europe to Asia. Occasionally naturalised in Britain.

Species include:
Smyrnium cordifolium
 Smyrnium dodonaei Spreng.
Smyrnium creticum
Smyrnium olusatrum - alexanders, black-lovage, horse-parsley
Smyrnium perfoliatum - perfoliate alexanders

References

Apioideae
Apioideae genera